Wouter is a Dutch masculine given name popular in the Netherlands and Belgium. It is the Dutch equivalent of the English name Walter and French name Gauthier, both of Germanic origin, meaning "ruler of the army", "army of the forest" or "bright army". Wouter is sometimes shortened to Wout. The patronymic surname of Wouter is Wouters.

People named Wouter

Sports
Wouter olde Heuvel, Dutch speed skater
Wouter Claes, Belgian badminton player
Wouter Mol, Dutch professional road racing cyclist
Wouter Toledo, Dutch figure skater
Wouter Poels, Dutch professional road bicycle racer
Wout van Aert, Belgian professional cyclist
Wouter Wippert, Dutch professional road racing cyclist
Wouter Jolie, Dutch field hockey player
Wouter Brouwer, Dutch fencer
Wouter van Pelt, Dutch field hockey player
Wouter Corstjens, Dutch-Belgian footballer
Wouter D'Haene, Belgian sprint canoer
Wouter Biebauw, Belgian footballer
Wouter Marinus, Dutch professional footballer
Wouter de Vogel, Dutch footballer
Wouter Weylandt, Belgian professional cyclist
Wouter van der Steen, Dutch professional footballer
Wouter Degroote, Belgian footballer
Wouter Scheelen, Belgian footballer
Wouter Artz, Dutch professional footballer
Wouter Gudde, Dutch footballer
Wouter Vrancken, Belgian footballer
Wouter Vandenhaute, Belgian sports journalist
Wouter Sybrandy, Dutch professional road racing cyclist
Wout Wagtmans, Dutch road racing cyclist
Wouter Leefers, Dutch field hockey player
Wout Weghorst, Dutch footballer

Entertainment
Wouter "Wally" De Backer, Belgian-Australian multi-instrumentalist and singer-songwriter, known as Gotye
Wouter Deprez, Belgian comedian
Wouter Hamel, Dutch pop singer
Wouter Barendrecht, Dutch film producer
Wouter Janssen, Dutch musician
Wouter Kellerman, South African flautist
Wouter van der Goes, Dutch radio DJ

Politics
Wouter Koolmees, Dutch politician
Wouter Beke, Belgian politician
Wouter De Vriendt, Belgian politician
Wouter Bos, Dutch politician
Wouter Van Besien, Belgian politician
Wouter Van Bellingen, Flemish politician

Art
Wouter Crabeth I, Dutch Renaissance glass painter
Wouter Crabeth II, Dutch Golden Age painter and grandson of Wouter Crabeth I
Wouter Knijff, Dutch Golden Age landscape painter
Wouter Abts, Belgian painter
Wouterus Verschuur, Dutch painter
Wouter Johannes van Troostwijk, Dutch 19th century painter

Other
Wouter Basson (born 1950), South African cardiologist
Wouter Berthout van Ranst, Belgian nobleman
Wouter Biesiot (1951–1998), Dutch head of the Energy and Materials Group
Wouter Deelen (c.1500–1563), Dutch Anabaptist
Wouter den Haan (born 1962), Dutch Professor of Economics
Wouter Hanegraaff (born 1961), Dutch Professor of History of Hermetic Philosophy
Wouter Lutkie (1887–1968), Dutch Catholic priest and fascist
Wouter Schievink (born 1963), Dutch neurological surgeon
Wouter Snijders (1928–2020), Dutch judge and legal scholar
Wouter Tebbens (born 1974), Dutch activist
Wouter van Twiller (1606–1654), Dutch West India Company employee

See also
 Walter
 Walters
 Wolter
 Walther

References

Dutch masculine given names